Amy G. Rice (born 1966) is an American attorney and former Democratic member of the Rhode Island House of Representatives, representing the 72nd District from 2005 to 2011. She served on the House Committees on Judiciary, and Environment and Natural Resources. On February 11, 2010 she was elected as Deputy Majority Leader of the House of Representatives. Rice was defeated for reelection in 2010 by Daniel Patrick Reilly.

References

External links
Rhode Island Secretary of State - Representative Amy G. Rice official RI Secretary of State website

Democratic Party members of the Rhode Island House of Representatives
Rhode Island lawyers
1966 births
Living people
Women state legislators in Rhode Island
People from Portsmouth, Rhode Island
University of Rhode Island alumni
Suffolk University Law School alumni
Salve Regina University alumni
21st-century American women